Caroline Elkins (American, born Caroline Fox, 1969) is Professor of History and African and African American Studies at Harvard University, the Thomas Henry Carroll/Ford Foundation Professor of Business Administration at Harvard Business School, Affiliated Professor at Harvard Law School, and the Founding Oppenheimer Faculty Director of Harvard's Center for African Studies.

Her first book, Imperial Reckoning: The Untold Story of Britain's Gulag in Kenya (2005), won the 2006 Pulitzer Prize for General Nonfiction. It was also the basis for successful claims by former Mau Mau detainees against the British government for crimes committed in the internment camps of Kenya in the 1950s. Elkins's later book, Legacy of Violence: A History of the British Empire (2022), received significant reviewer praise, with one calling it a "tour de force of historical excavation." It was a finalist for the Baillie Gifford Award, selected as one of The New York Times Top 100 Books of 2022, and named as a best book of 2022 by The New Statesman, the BBC, History Today, and Waterstones.

Biography
Raised in Ocean Township, Monmouth County, New Jersey, Elkins graduated from Ocean Township High School in 1987. She was a three-sport varsity athlete (soccer, field hockey, and basketball), winning multiple all-state and all-Shore awards, and heavily recruited at the collegiate level, ultimately deciding to attend Princeton where she played varsity soccer and golf. She was inducted into her high school's athletic hall of fame in 2000.

Mau Mau Rebellion

Elkins majored in history at Princeton, graduating summa cum laude before moving to Harvard for her master's and doctorate. Her historical methodology, which includes use of written sources as well as ethnographic field work and oral interviews, has led to major revisions in the fields of African and British imperial histories, and has also generated significant criticism, particularly from conservative academics. Elkins' Harvard PhD was concerned with the detention system employed by the colonial authorities during the Mau Mau Uprising, and served as the basis of the 2002 BBC documentary, Kenya: White Terror, in which Elkins and her fieldwork were both profiled. Kenya: White Terror won the International Red Cross Award at the Monte Carlo Film Festival. Elkins's dissertation provided the foundation for her 2005 publication, Imperial Reckoning, which was met with critical acclaim in newspapers and magazines around the world, including The New York Times, The Washington Post, The Guardian, and The Economist. In addition to winning the Pulitzer Prize for General Nonfiction in 2006, Imperial Reckoning was named a book of the year by The Economist and an editors' choice by The New York Times, and was a finalist for the Lionel Gelber Prize. In its commendation of Elkins, the Pulitzer Prize Committee wrote: "Imperial Reckoning is history of the highest order: meticulously researched, brilliantly written, and powerfully dramatic. An unforgettable act of historical re-creation, it is also a disturbing reminder of the brutal imperial precedents that continue to inform Western nations in their drive to democratize the world."

Elkins has been a professor at Harvard University since she completed her doctoral degree in Harvard's history department in 2001. She received tenure in 2009, and subsequently became the founding director of Harvard's Center for African Studies. She was appointed the Oppenheimer Faculty Director and in her six years as director created one of the world's largest institutions for the study of Africa, raising significant funds and garnering from the US Department of Education's the distinction as a National Resource Center for African Studies.  Elkins currently teaches courses on contextual intelligence, modern Africa, the British Empire, and colonial violence in the 20th century.

In 2009, Imperial Reckoning served as the basis for an unprecedented legal claim filed by five Mau Mau detention camp survivors against the British government, and Elkins became the claimants' first expert witness before being joined by other historians in late 2010 and 2011. The case, known as Mutua and Five Others versus the Foreign and Commonwealth Office (FCO), was heard at the High Court of Justice in London with the Honourable Justice McCombe presiding. London human rights law firm Leigh Day and the Kenya Human Rights Commission (KHRC) in Nairobi were the claimants' legal representatives. During the course of legal discovery the FCO discovered some 300 boxes of previously undisclosed files that validated on a large scale Elkins' claims in Imperial Reckoning and provided thousands of pages of new evidence supporting the claimants' case of gross abuses perpetrated by colonial officials in the detention camps of Kenya in the 1950s.

On June 6, 2013, the British government announced a settlement with the Mau Mau claimants, issuing its official apology of "sincere regret," a £20 million cash payment, and a monument to those tortured during the uprising, unveiled in Nairobi's Uhuru Park in 2015. In the wake of the settlement, Kenyan MP, Paul Muite, told the press that, "Without her research, we would not have been able to mount this suit. The research portion was a momentous task and I credit Elkins for the success of filing the case. We recognised the research and preparatory work (to file the case) had to be perfect."

Legacy of Violence

Elkins's later book, Legacy of Violence: A History of the British Empire (2022), received starred reviews from Kirkus, Library Journal, and Publishers Weekly, which also interviewed Elkins, who stated that, "I don’t believe that taking down statues erases or distorts history. Burning or hiding documents—that certainly erases and distorts history. I was an expert witness in a lawsuit against the British government by Kenyan survivors of detention camps, which led to the 'discovery' of several hundred boxes of unreleased government files on the camps. My book [Legacy of Violence] is, in part, about how we write history when much of the evidence has been destroyed or concealed. This is an important moment, in which statues and documents are coming together to help us reassess how the world became what it is." 

Reviewers call Legacy of Violence "Top-shelf history offering tremendous acknowledgement of past systemic abuses," and "a feat of scholarship that elucidates the bureaucratic and legal machinery of oppression, dissects the intellectual justifications for it, and explores in gripping, sometimes grisly detail the suffering that resulted. The result is a forceful challenge to recent historiographical and political defenses of British exceptionalism that punctures myths of paternalism and progress."

Positive reviewers include historians Rana Mitter, Geoffrey Wheatcroft, Maya Jasanoff, Richard Drayton, Alex von Tunzelmann, John Darwin, Robert Gildea, Priya Satia, Erik Linstrum, William Roger Louis, and Jill Lepore. Other scholars and journalists delivering positive reviews include Homi Bhabha, Howard W. French, Tim Adams, Amitav Ghosh, Robbie Millen, and Priyamvada Gopal.

Historian Robert Lyman gave it a negative review calling it "a piece of ideology masquerading as history". University of Maryland historian Richard N. Price likewise remarked that "if the book tends to overstuff its argument, it is also a book that is curiously thin in its conceptualization. Nuance and subtlety are strikingly absent throughout all the key arguments of the book."

Selected works

See also
 Fitz Remedios Santana de Souza
 Foreign and Commonwealth Office migrated archives

References

Further reading

External links 
Staff profile, Harvard University
BBC Kenya: White Terror 
 Ofcom report on complaints against the documentary "Kenya: White Terror"

1969 births
Living people
Pulitzer Prize for General Non-Fiction winners
American women historians
Harvard Fellows
Harvard University faculty
Harvard University alumni
Ocean Township High School alumni
People from Ocean Township, Monmouth County, New Jersey
Princeton University alumni
Writers from New Jersey
21st-century American historians
21st-century American non-fiction writers
21st-century American women writers
Date of birth missing (living people)
Place of birth missing (living people)